The 1997 Australian Drivers' Championship was a motor racing competition open to drivers of racing cars complying with CAMS Formula Holden regulations. The championship winner was awarded the 1997 CAMS Gold Star as the Australian Drivers' Champion. It was the 41st running of the Australian Drivers' Championship, and the ninth to feature the Formula Holden category which had been developed during 1988. The championship began on 15 March 1997 at the Calder Park Raceway and ended on 3 August at Oran Park Raceway after seven rounds of a series which was promoted as the "Holden Australian Drivers Championship".

Jason Bright, in his second season in Formula Holden and as new team leader of Birrana Racing, raced to the title, winning eight of the 14 races over the course of the season, wrapping up the championship at the sixth round and choosing to miss the final round. SH Racing's Jason Bargwanna finished second just 13 points behind Bright, although 40 of his points came from two wins at Oran Park in Bright's absence. Mark Noske, driving a Lola, was the only driver to take race wins away from the two Jasons. He was in contention for the championship early in the season, but his charge faded mid-year as he experienced problems at Winton and Eastern Creek and lost third place in the points to New Zealand teenager Scott Dixon in the Ralt Australia prepared Reynard.

Drivers
The following drivers competed in the 1997 Australian Drivers' Championship.

Note: Formula Holden technical regulations mandated that cars be powered by 3.8 litre Holden V6 engines.

Race calendar
The 1997 Australian Drivers' Championship was contested over seven rounds held in three different states. Each round consisted of two races.

Points system
Championship points were awarded on a 20–15–12–10–8–6–4–3–2–1 basis for the first ten places in each race.

Championship results 

Note: Race 2 at the opening round at Calder was declared a No Race and no championship points were awarded.

References

External links
 CAMS On Line Manual of Motor Sport > Titles - CAMS Gold Star
 Formula Holden at www.minerva.com.au

Australian Drivers' Championship
Drivers' Championship
Formula Holden
Australian Drivers